Hanna Gunilla Marklund (born November 26, 1977 in Skellefteå) is a Swedish former football player. She played as a defender and wore shirt number 4.

Career
Marklund started playing in Varuträsk IF near Skellefteå, where she grew up. She moved on to play in Damallsvenskan with Sunnanå SK. In 2000, she joined Umeå IK, with whom she won Damallsvenskan three years in a row (2000–2002). After the 2004 season she decided to move back to Skellefteå and rejoin Sunnanå SK, where her two sisters Carolina and Mirjam also played. She went on to captain Sunnanå SK.

She made her first appearance in the Swedish national team on August 8, 1997 against Iceland. She became a regular member of the team, winning a total of 118 caps and scoring six international goals.

In November 2005 she won Diamantbollen, an award given the best female player in Sweden each year.

On January 7, 2008, Marklund announced her retirement from both the national team and Sunnanå SK as a result of her pregnancy.

Matches and goals scored at World Cup & Olympic tournaments
Hanna Marklund appeared for Sweden in two World Cups (USA 2003, China 2007) and two Olympic Games (Sydney 2000, Athens 2004.) Marklund was on the roster for the 1999 World Cup as well, but did not see any playing time.

Matches and goals scored at European Championship tournaments
Hanna Marklund participated in two European Championship tournaments: Germany 2001, and England 2005.

International goals

Honours

Club
Umeå IK
 Damallsvenskan: Winner (3) 2000, 2001, 2002
 Runner-up (2) 2003, 2004
 Svenska Cupen: Winner (3) 2001, 2002, 2003
 Runner-up 2004
 UEFA Women's Champions League: Winner (2) 2002-2003, 2003-2004

Sunnanå SK
 Svenska Cupen: Runner-up 1997

Individual
Fotbollsgalan 2005
 Diamantbollen: Best female player in Sweden 2005
 Best female defence in Sweden 2005
Fotbollsgalan 2006
 Best female defence in Sweden 2006
Fotbollsgalan 2007
 Best female defence in Sweden 2007

International tournaments with the national team
UEFA Women's Championship: Runner-up 2001, Third 2005
FIFA Women's World Cup 1999
FIFA Women's World Cup 2003: Runner-up 2003
FIFA Women's World Cup 2007
2000 Summer Olympics in Sydney
2004 Summer Olympics in Athens

References

Match reports

External links
The Hanna Marklund Club on Yahoo!
Profile of Swedish Womens National Team players on Expressen (in Swedish)

1977 births
Living people
Footballers at the 2000 Summer Olympics
Footballers at the 2004 Summer Olympics
Olympic footballers of Sweden
Swedish women's footballers
Sweden women's international footballers
FIFA Century Club
Damallsvenskan players
Umeå IK players
People from Skellefteå Municipality
Sunnanå SK players
1999 FIFA Women's World Cup players
2003 FIFA Women's World Cup players
2007 FIFA Women's World Cup players
Women's association football defenders
Sportspeople from Västerbotten County